Eglington may refer to:

People
Nathan Eglington (born 1980), Australian hockey player
Richard Eglington (1908–1979), English cricketer
Tommy Eglington (1923–2004), Irish footballer
Eglington Margaret Pearson (c. 1746 – 1823), English stained glass painter

Other uses
Eglington Cemetery, Clarksboro, New Jersey, U.S.

See also
Eglinton (disambiguation)
John Eglington Bailey (1840–1888), English antiquary
Egling, a municipality in Bavaria, Germany

fr:Eglington